St. Clare's is a series of nine books written by English children's authors Enid Blyton and Pamela Cox about a boarding school of that name. The series follows the heroines Patricia "Pat" and Isabel O'Sullivan from their first year at St. Clare's on. Other characters include Alison O'Sullivan (the twins' cousin), Hilary Wentworth, Sadie Green (Alison's spoilt friend who always thought about her looks and the cinema ), Kathleen Gregory, Janet Robins, Doris Elward, Vera Johns, Sheila Naylor, Roberta "Bobby" Ellis, Pamela Boardman, "Sour Milk" Prudence Arnold, Carlotta Brown (an ex-circus girl), "Catty" Elsie Fanshawe, Gladys Hillman, Mirabel Unwin, Kitty Flaherty (who brings her pet goat, McGinty, to the school), Pauline Bingham-Jones, sisters Claudine and Antoinette, "the Honourable" Angela Favorleigh, Alma Pudden, Anne-Marie Longden, Felicity Ray (a musical genius), Winifred James (the head girl when Pat and Isabel were in the first form), Belinda Towers ( The games captain when Pat and Isabel were in the first form, She later became the head girl when Winifred left the school ), Tessie (the head girl of the second form), Margery Fenworthy (who got expelled from six schools but made a fresh start at St. Clare's), Lucy Oriell (who became Margery's friend), Erica (the troublemaker), Priscilla Parsons (a sixth former who is expelled) and Joan Terry (who was bullied by Priscilla).

The teachers are:
Miss Roberts (the first-form teacher), Miss Jenks (the second-form teacher), Miss Adams (the third-form teacher), Miss Ellis (the fourth-form teacher), Miss Cornwallis (the fifth-form teacher), Miss Harry (the sixth-form teacher), Miss Kennedy (the substitute teacher who took over as history teacher for a term), Miss Lewis (the regular history teacher who was sick for a term), Miss Wilton (the games teacher), Miss Quentin (the short-lived drama teacher), Miss Willcox (the pretentious temporary English teacher) Miss Walker (The Art Teacher ), Mam'zelle (the French mistress) and Miss Theobald (the headmistress, who also coaches students in maths).

Bibliography

Original series 
Enid Blyton published the original six books of St. Clare's series from 1941 to 1945.

Continuation series 
Pamela Cox published three more books in the series:

Dean School Omnibus Editions

Adaptations 
The series was adapted into a 1991 anime television series, Mischievous Twins: The Tales of St. Clare's, by Tokyo Movie Shinsha.

In German Language the series was named "Hanni & Nanni" and received ample changes in names, places and characteristics resembling more to the German taste. Up to date 39 books have been published, with only episodes 1-4, 11 and 13 basing on Blyton's originals, Parts 19 and 20 are adapted from Pamela Cox' editions Third Form at St. Clare's and Sixth Form at St. Clare’s. Cox's third book Kitty at St Clare’s has not yet been adapted.

A German audio drama named Hanni & Nanni, produced by EUROPA. Up to 2019, 65 episodes have been published, the storyline differs from the books, especially the later episodes.

Four German films:
 Hanni & Nanni (2010)
  (2012)
  (2013)
  (2017)

References

External links
 Enid Blyton Website
 
 The Twins at St. Clare's - TMS ENTERTAINMENT CO., LTD.
 TOKYO MX * animated cartoon "Institute of playful twin - Clare story -"

Book series introduced in 1941
 
Enid Blyton series